Lucenti is an Italian surname. Notable people with the surname include:

Emmanuel Lucenti
Giorgio Lucenti (born 1975), Italian footballer
Gaetano Lucenti, Italian footballer
Girolamo Lucenti (1627–1692), Italian sculptor
Matteo Lucenti
Rodrigo Lucenti

Italian-language surnames